Sattelegg Pass (el. 1190 m.) is a high mountain pass in the Alps in the canton of Schwyz in Switzerland, connecting Siebnen and Willerzell. The road has a maximum grade of 14 percent.

On the Sattelegg is a restaurant, a small chapel, and a ski elevator.

See also

 List of highest paved roads in Europe
 List of mountain passes
List of the highest Swiss passes

Mountain passes of Switzerland
Mountain passes of the Alps
Mountain passes of the canton of Schwyz